The Vijay for Favorite Song is given by STAR Vijay as part of its annual Vijay Awards ceremony for Tamil (Kollywood) films. The award is chosen through public voting. Harris Jayaraj is the most frequent winner with three wins .

The list
Here is a list of the award winners and the films for which they won.

Nominations
 2008 Harris Jayaraj Anjala from Vaaranam Aayiram
 Harris Jayaraj - Mundhinam Parthene from Vaaranam Aayiram
 Harris Jayaraj - Nenjukkul Peidhidum from Vaaranam Aayiram
 James Vasanthan - Kangal Irandal from Subramaniapuram
 Himesh Reshammiya - Kallai Mattum from Dasavathaaram
 2009 Vijay Antony - Chinna Thamarai from Vettaikaaran
 Harris Jayaraj - Vizhi Moodi from Ayan
 Harris Jayaraj - Hasili Fisili from Aadhavan
 Yuvan Shankar Raja - Oru Kal from Siva Manasula Sakthi
 Vijay Antony - Aathichoodi from TN 07 AL 4777
 2010 Yuvan Shankar Raja - En Kadhal Solla from Paiyaa
 A. R. Rahman - Kilimanjaro from Enthiran
 Devi Sri Prasad - Kaadhal Vandhaale from Singam
 A. R. Rahman - Hosanna from Vinnaithaandi Varuvaayaa
 G. V. Prakash Kumar - Un Mela Aasadhaan from Aayirathil Oruvan
 2011 Harris Jayaraj - Enamo Aedho from Ko
 G. V. Prakash Kumar - Kadhal En Kadhal from Mayakkam Enna
 G. V. Prakash Kumar - Otha Sollaala from Aadukalam
 S. Thaman - Kalasala from Osthe
 Yuvan Shankar Raja - Vilaiyaadu Mankatha from Mankatha
 2012 Harris Jayaraj - Google Google from Thuppakki
 Anirudh Ravichander - Why This Kolaveri Di from 3
 D. Imman - Sollitaley Ava Kaadhala from Kumki
 Harris Jayaraj - Venaam Machan from Oru Kal Oru Kannadi
 Krishna Kumar - Vaayamoodi Summa Iruda from Mugamoodi
 2013 D Imman - Oootha Colouru Ribbon from Varuthapadatha Valibar Sangam
 Anirudh Ravichander - "Ethir Neechaladi" from Ethir Neechal
 A. R. Rahman - "Nenjukulle" from Kadal
 G. V. Prakash Kumar - "Hey Baby" from Raja Rani
 Santhosh Narayanan - "Kaasu Panam" from Soodhu Kavvum
 2014 Anirudh Ravichander - "Amma Amma" from Velaiyilla Pattathari
 D Imman - "Koodamela Koodavechu" from Rummy
 Anirudh Ravichander - "Selfie Pulla" from Kaththi
 Santhosh Narayanan - "Naan Nee" from Madras
 Harris Jayaraj - "Aathangara Orathil" from Yaan

See also
 Tamil cinema
 Cinema of India

References

Favorite Song
Film awards for Best Song